NVC community M20 (Eriophorum vaginatum raised and blanket mire) is one of the mire communities in the British National Vegetation Classification system.

It is a comparatively localised community. There are two subcommunities.

Community composition
Two constant species, Common Cottongrass (Eriophorum angustifolium) and Hare's-tail Cottongrass (Eriophorum vaginatum), are found in this community.

No rare species are associated with the community.

Distribution
This community is found throughout northern England. It is extensive in the southern Pennines, but more local elsewhere. It is also found locally in eastern Scotland and south Wales. It is mainly found within tracts of upland blanket bog, but also locally on raised bogs.

Subcommunities
There are two subcommunities:
 the so-called Species-poor subcommunity
 the Calluna vulgaris - Cladonia spp. subcommunity

References
 Rodwell, J. S. (1991) British Plant Communities Volume 2 - Mires and heaths  (hardback),  (paperback)

M20